Final results for the Handball competition at the 1988 Summer Olympics.

Medal summary

Participating nations

Each qualified country was allowed to enter one team of 15 players and they all were eligible for participation. Five nations competed in both tournaments.

A total of 282(*) handball players (171 men and 111 women) from 15 nations (men from 12 nations - women from 8 nations) competed at the Seoul Games:

  (men:14 women:0)
  (men:0 women:12)
  (men:0 women:14)
  (men:14 women:15)
  (men:13 women:0)
  (men:14 women:0)
  (men:15 women:0)
  (men:15 women:0)
  (men:0 women:15)
  (men:14 women:12)
  (men:14 women:15)
  (men:15 women:0)
  (men:14 women:0)
  (men:14 women:14)
  (men:15 women:14)
(*) NOTE: There are only players counted, which participated in one game at least.

Medal table

References

External links
Official Olympic Report

 
1988 Summer Olympics events
Olym
Olymp
Women's events at the 1988 Summer Olympics